The 2016 Blossom Cup was a professional tennis tournament played on outdoor hard courts. It was the eighth edition of the tournament and part of the 2016 ITF Women's Circuit, offering a total of $50,000 in prize money. It took place in Quanzhou, China, on 21–27 March 2016.

Singles main draw entrants

Seeds 

 1 Rankings as of 7 March 2016.

Other entrants 
The following players received wildcards into the singles main draw:
  Ye Qiuyu
  You Xiaodi
  Yuan Yue
  Zhao Di

The following players received entry from the qualifying draw:
  Gao Xinyu
  Guo Shanshan
  Peangtarn Plipuech
  Tian Ran

Champions

Singles

 Wang Qiang def.  Liu Fangzhou, 6–2, 6–2

Doubles

 Shuko Aoyama /  Makoto Ninomiya def.  Lu Jingjing /  Zhang Yuxuan, 6–3, 6–0

External links 
 2016 Blossom Cup at ITFtennis.com

2016 ITF Women's Circuit
2016 in Chinese tennis
Industrial Bank Cup